Ladislaus Kán may refer to:
 Ladislaus I Kán (d. after 1247)
 Ladislaus II Kán (d. 1278)
 Ladislaus III Kán (d. 1315)
 Ladislaus IV Kán